Alfred Lesbros (1873–1940) was a French painter born in Montfavet, near Avignon, France. He painted approximately a thousand works that can be seen in museums and public collections in Aix-en-Provence, Arles, Avignon, Marseille, Montpellier and Tournon. Some of his works have gained interest and local fame: "La cour de la livrée de Thury", "Le jardin", "Footing" (Calvet Museum, Avignon). From impressionism to cubism, Alfred Lesbros took part in the artistic revolutions of the early twentieth century.

Some works 
 La Tour Philippe Le Bel, 1920
 Porte de Roussillon avec les plantes sauvages ou La Peau de la panthère, 1926
 Jardin du musée Calvet, 1927
 Le Pont Saint-Bénezet aux galets, 1927–1928
 Le Chemin à Villeneuve, 1928
 Rue Pente-Rapide à Avignon, 1932
 La Vierge au jardin, 1932
 Le Tournant de Barbentane, 1936
 Vallon des Grenadiers Sauvages, 1937
 Le Pont Saint-Bénezet, 1937
 Le Jardin fleuri, 1937
 Le Vieux Moulin à Barbentane, 1938
 La Maison rose, 1939
 La Cour de la livrée de Thury
 Le Jardin
 Promenade
 Maison en Provence

Gallery

External links

 Alfred Lesbros on Artistes Provencaux

References

Eliane Aujard-Catot, Alfred Lesbros, Fondation Louis Vouland, Avignon

19th-century French painters
French male painters
20th-century French painters
20th-century French male artists
1873 births
1940 deaths
19th-century French male artists